The IBM 7340 "Hypertape" system was a magnetic tape data storage format designed to work with the IBM 7074, 7080 and 7090 computers that was introduced in 1961 and withdrawn in 1971.

As a technology, it deviated in several ways from the then dominant IBM 7 track system.  It distinguished itself by having higher capacity, faster data transfer speed, faster load times, and lower wear on the tape.  It achieved this by using tape that was twice as wide (1 vs. 1/2 inch), preloaded on two reels, and held in a large cassette.

Specs 
 Two reel cartridge
 1 inch wide tape
 10 track linear recording (8 data bits, 2 checksum bits)
 Capacity: 2  million characters
 Speed: 170,000 characters/second

See also 
 http://www-03.ibm.com/ibm/history/exhibits/storage/storage_7340.html - IBM 7340 hypertape drive
  - Modern Mechanix: Cartridge Tape System Is Fast, Compact (Dec, 1961)
 CSDL | IEEE Computer Society (PDF) - IBM 7340 HYPERTAPE DRIVE
 ibm :: magtape :: G22-6634 7340 Hypertape Oct61 - October 1961 Manual, G22-6634  7340 Hypertape

Tape-based computer storage
Computer-related introductions in 1961